Moelfre Uchaf is a hill in the borough of Conwy, North Wales,  south-east of Colwyn Bay and  south-west of Betws-yn-Rhos.
A trigpoint is on the summit.

External links
 www.geograph.co.uk : photos of Moelfre Uchaf and surrounding area

Betws yn Rhos
Mountains and hills of Conwy County Borough